The voiced retroflex nasal is a type of consonantal sound, used in some spoken languages.

Like all the retroflex consonants, the IPA symbol is formed by adding a rightward-pointing hook extending from the bottom of an en (the letter used for the corresponding alveolar consonant).

Features

Features of the voiced retroflex nasal:

Occurrence

Retroflex nasal flap

Features 
Features of the retroflex nasal tap or flap:

Occurrence

See also
 Index of phonetics articles

Notes

References

External links
 

Retroflex consonants
Nasal consonants
Pulmonic consonants
Voiced consonants